American International College (AIC) is a private college in Springfield, Massachusetts.

History
American International College was originally established on July 18, 1885, as the French Protestant College by Rev. Calvin E. Amaron, who sought to create an institution of higher learning that would provide the local French Protestant minority with access to higher education.

Academics
The college offers undergraduate and graduate programs, including master's and doctoral degrees and certificates of advanced graduate study (CAGS). There are three schools which focus on their respective academic areas:

 School of Business, Arts, and Sciences: Bachelor's and master's degrees.
 School of Health Sciences: Bachelor's, master's, and doctoral degrees.
 School of Education: Master's and doctoral degrees.

Undergraduate students choose from 37 majors as they earn a Bachelor of Arts (B.A.), Bachelor of Science (B.S.), Bachelor of Science in Nursing (B.S.N.) or Bachelor of Science in Business Administration (B.S.B.A). Certificates and other non-degree programs are also offered.

Athletics

The school competes in NCAA Division II, and is a member of the Northeast-10 Conference for all but four sports.

Among the exceptions is the school's men's ice hockey team, which is a member of the Division I, Atlantic Hockey Association. The team participated in its first NCAA Men's Ice Hockey Championship in 2019 and defeated nationally ranked No.1 St. Cloud State in the first round.  Additionally, the college's wrestling program, which is the only NCAA DII program in New England, competes as an independent.

AIC also has a college rugby program that was founded in 2009 and began play in 2010. The rugby program is part of the school's athletic department, has varsity status, with rugby scholarships available for students.  AIC's men's team plays Division 1A in the Liberty Conference, while the women's team is a member of the NIRA.

Notable alumni

Politics 
 Paul Babeu, Arizona sheriff
 Mark G. Mastroianni, United States District Judge of the United States District Court for the District of Massachusetts
 William D. Mullins, member of the Massachusetts House of Representatives
 Richard Neal, member of the United States House of Representatives
 Mike Gravel, Alaska Senator
 Michael C. Polt, US diplomat and former Ambassador to Estonia, Serbia, and Serbia and Montenegro

Athletics 
 Jim Calhoun, college basketball coach
 Asnage Castelly, Olympic wrestler
 Harrison Fitch, college basketball player
 Dave Forbes, professional hockey player
 Mario Elie, professional basketball player and coach
 Bruce Laird, professional football player
 Tom Rychlec, professional football player

References

External links

 
 American International College Athletics website

 
Educational institutions established in 1885
1885 establishments in Massachusetts